Dmitri Mikhaylovich Sysuyev (born 13 January 1988) is a Russian professional football player. He plays as an attacking midfielder or striker for Murom.

Personal life
His younger brother Vladislav Sysuyev is also a footballer.

Career statistics

Club

References

External links
 

1988 births
People from Saransk
Living people
Russian footballers
Association football forwards
FC Torpedo Moscow players
FC Sibir Novosibirsk players
FC Baltika Kaliningrad players
FC Mordovia Saransk players
Russian Premier League players
FC Ufa players
Sportspeople from Mordovia